Stephen Glasser (July 27, 1943 – August 25, 2022) was an American publisher who founded the Legal Times.

Biography
Stephen Glasser was born on 27 July 1943 in Memphis, Tennessee. He attended and graduated with a bachelor's degree in political science from Colgate University in 1965. Later, in the same year, he married Lynn Schreiber. In 1968, he graduated with a law degree from the University of Michigan.

After his graduation, he briefly worked for Labor Department before joining the New York Law Journal.

In 1978, Glasser started a weekly newspaper, Legal Times, with his wife.

In 1995, he founded Glasser LegalWorks which was acquired by FindLaw in 2003.

References

1933 births
2022 deaths
American newspaper founders
People from Memphis, Tennessee
University of Michigan Law School alumni